Banda Karthika Reddy (born 17 August 1977) is an Indian politician and Former Mayor of Greater Hyderabad Municipal Corporation, Telangana, India. She is the first Mayor of Greater Hyderabad Municipal Corporation  in 2009 and is a member of the Bharatiya Janata Party.

Early life
Karthika Banda was born on 17 August 1977 in Hyderabad, India. She is a post-graduate in Sociology from Osmania University and a Sportswoman.

Political career

She became the first mayor of Greater Hyderabad in December 2009.

She became the vice-chairperson, All India Mayors' Council, 2010.

She joined the Bharatiya Janata Party in 2020.

Personal life
Karthika Reddy is married to Banda Chandra Reddy, who is also a Congress party member. They have two sons, Kanishq and Showmik.

References

External links
 GHMC site

Indian National Congress politicians from Andhra Pradesh
Women mayors of places in Telangana
1977 births
Living people
Osmania University alumni
Mayors of Hyderabad, India
21st-century Indian women politicians
21st-century Indian politicians
Bharatiya Janata Party politicians from Telangana